Johnnie & Jack were an American country music duo, composed of Johnnie Wright (1914–2011) and Jack Anglin (1916–1963). The duo became members of the Grand Ole Opry in the 1940s.  Between 1951 and 1962, the duo released several singles on the RCA Victor Records label, including their version of "Goodnite, Sweetheart, Goodnite" which peaked at No. 4 on the Best Seller charts, and  the No. 1 "(Oh Baby Mine) I Get So Lonely".

Following Anglin's death in a car accident in 1963, Wright became a solo artist, topping the country charts in 1965 with "Hello Vietnam".

Discography

Albums

Singles

References

[ Johnnie & Jack biography] at Allmusic

Notes

American country music groups
Country music duos
Grand Ole Opry members
Musical groups established in 1938
Musical groups disestablished in 1963
RCA Victor artists